Phi Omega Pi was a national collegiate sorority operating in the United States from 1922 until 1946 when its chapters were absorbed by several larger sororities, and merged with national sorority, Delta Zeta.

History 
The sorority originally formed as Achoth ( signifying one's blood sister or a female relative), created on the campus of the University of Nebraska on March 15, 1910. The fifteen founding sisters were all members in good standing of the Order of the Eastern Star. In a letter to the fraternity, Jessie Downing explained to Sigma Phi Epsilon that Achoth "is similar to that of the Acacia fraternity, but in no way are the two connected". In 1911, it was officially recognized by the Order of the Eastern Star organization and only Eastern Star members were permitted to join. Chapters were named in Hebrew alphabetic order, The first chapter was Aleph (Nebraska), the second Beth (Iowa), etc.

The sorority published a magazine called the Kochev.

Sources from various fraternal organization demonstrate that Achoth was functioning as a typical collegiate sorority. The Trident of Delta Delta Delta (1920) recorded Achoth's petition for admission to the National Panhellenic Congress, but that this was denied (The Adelphean, 1921).

Achoth may have changed their official name as early as 1922. Kappa Sigma's Caduceus (1922) reported that the "Supreme Governing Council of Achoth announces the change of the name 'Achoth' to 'Phi Omega Pi' fraternity." Other contemporary publications refer to Achoth as Achoth, e.g. "A chapter of Achoth, the organization of Eastern Star members, was installed last March" (IU Alumni Quarterly, 1922). The chapters were renamed according to the Greek alphabet and the sorority's periodical was renamed from Kochev to The Pentagon (Miner, p. 146).

In 1933, Phi Omega Pi dropped the Masonic requirement and was thus given full membership into the National Panhellenic Conference.

That same year, the sorority absorbed two other organizations. Sigma Phi Beta was a national group with ten chapters. Founded on November 1, 1920 at New York University as Sigma Sigma Omicron, in July 1927 its name was changed to Sigma Phi Beta (Miner, p. 148). Additionally, Phi Alpha Chi, formed at the University of California at Berkeley, was founded as The Tanewah in 1919. In 1926, that group renamed itself as the Alpha chapter of Phi Alpha Chi. They joined with Sigma Phi Beta just prior to the merger into Phi Omega Pi (Miner, p. 148).

One source describes a relatively uncomplicated merger: Miner (p. 146) explained that "after 1933, Achoth, Tanewah, Phi Alpha Chi, and Sigma Phi Beta members were all sisters in Phi Omega Pi. In the 1937 Pentagon, sixteen collegiate and 39 alumnae chapters and clubs were listed."  However Baird's Manual (20th ed.) notes: 
 "The chapters at Iowa State Teachers College, Newark State Normal and Montclair Teachers College were placed on the inactive list by order of the Panhellenic Congress when [in 1933] Phi Omega Pi joined it.  In the period following, chapters were taken over by Alpha Omicron Pi, Alpha Gamma Delta, Sigma Kappa, and Kappa Alpha Theta. The group disbanded in 1946. Through an NPC committee, Delta Zeta was asked to consider the alumnae and a few chapters which remained. [Thus, i]n 1946, the members of } were accepted into Delta Zeta sorority.

It appears, therefore, that the chapters which were dropped as part of negotiations to join the Panhellenic Congress had come from Sigma Phi Beta, and were not original Achoth or Phi Omega Pi chapters.

Crest, Colors and Flower 

As described by Miner,

"[The crest of Phi Omega Pi] had a sapphire blue ground crossed by an inverted chevron of white upon which were placed five five pointed stars. Below the chevron and to the left was placed the sword and veil and to the right the lily of the valley with five bells. Above the chevron was the Roman numeral X. Surmounting the shield a crown below which was a rod. Beneath the shield a white ribbon upon which are the Greek letters ."

The colors were sapphire blue and white.  The official flower was the lily-of-the-valley.

Pins 

While the sorority was known as Achoth, the badge and its symbolism were described as follows: "...the pin bore the Hebrew characters Shin, Nun, Aleph, the initial letters of the organization's motto, but in 1920 the letters were changed to Greek, and in October of 1922, the name was changed to correspond with the letters on the pin. The chapters formerly were named in the order of the Hebrew alphabet, but with the change of name, they automatically took [names based on] the Greek alphabet."

This change occurred at the 1921 convention in Minneapolis. Thus the badge of Phi Omega Pi became "an irregular pentagon. The center was raised and in black enamel. The upper section was surmounted by a raised five pointed star set with a blue sapphire [above the letters  engraved in gold.] Around the edge of [the pentagon or] blade were set 20 whole pearls." (Miner, p. 146)

The pledge pin was "a black enameled pentagon bearing the Greek letters  in gold. The pentagon was banded in gold also." (Miner, p. 146)

Chapter List
The Chapter list:  Prior to 1923 these had Hebrew language chapter designations, so the Nebraska chapter would have been Aleph, the Iowa chapter Beth, etc. The chapter designations were recast into Greek form in 1922-23.
 - Alpha - University of Nebraska (formerly Aleph chapter )
 - Beta - University of Iowa (formerly Beth chapter )
 - Gamma - University of Illinois (formerly Gimel chapter )
 - Delta - University of Kansas (formerly Daleth chapter )
 - Epsilon - University of Washington (formerly Hay chapter )  
 - Zeta - North Dakota Agricultural College (formerly Waw chapter ) 
 - Eta - Iowa State Teachers College (formerly Zayin chapter )
- Theta - University of Wisconsin (formerly Kheth chapter )
1917 - Iota - University of Colorado (formerly Teth chapter ) (Inactive 1919) 
1917 - Kappa - University of Minnesota (formerly Yodh chapter )
1919 - California Alpha - University of California (formerly Kaph chapter )
1920 - Mu - Ohio State University (1933) (revived 1940)
1920 - New York Alpha - New York University from Sigma Phi Beta
1921 - Nu - University of Oklahoma (1929)
1921 - Alpha Epsilon - Montclair Teachers College from ???
1921 - Lambda (?) - Newark State Normal College (1933)
1922 - New York Gamma - Hunter College
1922 - Xi - Indiana University
1923 - Omicron - Kansas State College
1924 - Pi - Iowa State College (1934)
1924 - Rho - DePauw University (1933)
1924 - Omega - Wittenberg College (1937)
1925 - Sigma - University of California, Los Angeles
1925 - Alpha Alpha - Transylvania University
1926 - Tau - University of Washington
1927 - Psi - Alabama Polytechnic Institute
1928 - Upsilon - Oklahoma A&M University  ( 1932 )
1929 - Phi - University of Arizona ( 1933 )
1930 - Alpha Beta - Utah Agricultural College ( 1933 ) 
1937 - Alpha Zeta - Georgetown College

Additional chapters were formed, including:
 -  - Northwestern University

References 

Kappa Sigma Fraternity. (1981). The Caduceus. Charlottesville, VA: Kappa Sigma Fraternity. googlebooks Retrieved December 30, 2008
Miner, Florence Hood (1983). Delta Zeta Sorority 1902- 1982: Building on Yesterday, Reaching for Tomorrow. Delta Zeta Sorority, Compolith Graphics and Maury Boyd and Associates, Inc., Indianapolis, Indiana.

See also 
 Omega Epsilon Sigma
 Order of the Eastern Star

Fraternities and sororities in the United States
Defunct former members of the National Panhellenic Conference
Delta Zeta
1910 establishments in Nebraska
Student organizations established in 1910
Student organizations established in 1946
Masonic youth organizations